Francesco "Checco" Durante (19 November 1893 – 5 January 1976) was an Italian film actor. He appeared in 59 films between 1931 and 1973. He was born and died in Rome, Italy.

Selected filmography

 The Doctor in Spite of Himself (1931)
 The Amnesiac (1936) - L'allenatore Marinoni
 The Ferocious Saladin (1937) - Direttore del Teatro Vittoria
 The Castiglioni Brothers (1937) - L'oste
 I due barbieri (1937)
 The Black Corsair (1938) - Carmeau - Korsar
 Duetto vagabondo (1939)
 Il piccolo re (1939)
 La scuola dei timidi (1941)
 Perdizione (1942) - Il padrone dell'autorimessa
 The Taming of the Shrew (1942) - Il commendator Biondelli
 Don Juan (1942)
 Signorinette (1942) - Il padre di Iris
 Il treno crociato (1943) - Il capo cuoco (uncredited)
 L'innocente Casimiro (1945)
 Down with Misery (1945) - Il fattorino del radiogrammofono
 The Sun Still Rises (1946)
 Peddlin' in Society (1946) - Un frutivendolo
 Fury (1947) - Postman
 The Opium Den (1947) - Antonio, il finto cieco
 Il segreto di Don Giovanni (1947)
 Lo sciopero dei milioni (1947)
 L'isola di Montecristo (1948) - Faina
 The Street Has Many Dreams (1948) - Il parroco
 Twenty Years (1949)
 Santo disonore (1950) - Checco
 Variety Lights (1950) - Theater Owner
 The Two Sisters (1950) - Padron Cosimo
 Il nido di falasco (1950)
 Song of Spring (1951) - Pippo
 Verginità (1951) - Signor Corelli
 Auguri e figli maschi! (1951) - Ticket Inspector Antonio
 Rome-Paris-Rome (1951) - Meccanico
 Black Fire (1951)
 One Hundred Little Mothers (1952) - Il commissario
 Viva il cinema! (1952) - Ex Camera Operator
 Love and Poison (1952)
 Rome 11:00 (1952) - Padre di Adriana
 I figli non si vendono (1952) - Paolo Dazzeni
 Voice of Silence (1953) - Sacrestano
 The Return of Don Camillo (1953) - Il droghiere (uncredited)
 Easy Years (1953) - Usciere
 Angels of Darkness (1954) - Another relative of Francesco's
 Schiava del peccato (1954) - A Friend of Carlo
 The Last Race (1954)
 Il porto della speranza (1954)
 The Courier of Moncenisio (1954)
 If You Won a Hundred Million (1954) - Giovanni (segment "Il promesso... sposato")
 Accadde tra le sbarre (1955) - Pallotta - The thief
 La moglie è uguale per tutti (1955) - The Innkeeper
 Processo all'amore (1955) - Checco Mariani
 Motivo in maschera (1955)
 I dritti (1957) - Sor Cesare, padre di Aldo
 Love and Troubles (1958) - Virgilio Santucci
 Policarpo (1959) - Mario Marchetti's Father
 Adio Granada! (1967) - Sor Memmo
 Torture Me But Kill Me with Kisses (1968) - Direttore dell'agenzia camerieri
 Nel giorno del signore (1970) - fornaio Bragone
 In nome del popolo italiano (1971) - Archivista Pironti
 Buona parte di Paolina (1973)

References

External links

1893 births
1976 deaths
Italian male film actors
20th-century Italian male actors
Male actors from Rome